The Trinny Cove Formation is a formation cropping out in Newfoundland.

References

Ediacaran Newfoundland and Labrador